Jubal is a 1956 American Western film directed by Delmer Daves and starring Glenn Ford, Ernest Borgnine, Rod Steiger, Valerie French, and Felicia Farr. Shot in CinemaScope, it was one of the few adult westerns in the 1950s and is described as Othello on the Range. The supporting cast features Noah Beery Jr., Charles Bronson and Jack Elam.

Plot
Jubal Troop (Glenn Ford) is a cowboy who is found in a weakened condition, without a horse. He is given shelter at Shep Horgan's (Ernest Borgnine) large ranch, where he quickly makes an enemy in Pinky (Rod Steiger), a cattleman who accuses Jubal of carrying the smell of sheep.

Horgan is a cheerful, agreeable fellow who is married to an attractive, much younger woman named Mae (Valerie French) whom he met in Canada. He takes an immediate shine to Jubal and offers him a permanent job. Behind his back Mae also has taken a liking to Jubal, which she expresses to him in no uncertain terms. Horgan is impressed with Jubal's work ethic and makes him foreman over the other cowhands. That further antagonises Pinky, whom Horgan does not trust.

Jubal fends off Mae's advances while developing an interest in Naomi (Felicia Farr), a young woman from a travelling wagon train of an unnamed religious group that the cowboys call "rawhiders." Pinky and the other cowboys try to run off the strangers and resent Jubal's interference on their behalf. Jubal's only ally is a drifter named Reb (Charles Bronson), who has attached himself to the wagon train. On  Jubal's recommendation Reb is hired to help him at the ranch.

Pinky, who has carried on with Mae behind her husband's back, tells Horgan that his wife and Jubal have betrayed him. Horgan demands the truth from Mae, who angrily responds that she can't stand him and lies that Jubal has been seeing her.

An enraged Horgan rides to town and confronts Jubal, intending to kill him. Reb flips a gun to Jubal just in time and Horgan is shot dead.

Pinky makes another play for Mae, then beats her savagely when she pushes him away. Pinky then rallies the others to go after Jubal, persuading them that he stole Horgan's wife and murdered him. A posse gets the truth from a dying Mae, that her accusations toward Jubal were completely untrue. She also reveals, just before she dies, that Pinky beat her. The posse slowly circles Pinky and it's clear they intend to hang him. Jubal rides away with Naomi and Reb.

Cast
 Glenn Ford as Jubal Troop
 Ernest Borgnine as Shep Horgan
 Rod Steiger as "Pinky" Pinkum 
 Valerie French as Mae Horgan
 Felicia Farr as Naomi Hoktor
 Basil Ruysdael as Shem Hoktor
 Noah Beery Jr. as Sam – Horgan Rider 
 Charles Bronson as Reb Haislipp
 John Dierkes as Carson – Horgan Rider
 Jack Elam as McCoy – Bar 8 Rider 
 Robert Burton as Dr. Grant

Production
Rod Steiger's role was meant to be played by Columbia contract star Aldo Ray but he was unhappy at not receiving a bonus after being loaned out on other films, and refused to appear.

Reception
Upon the film's release, film critic Jonathan Rosenbaum praised the film, calling it a "taut, neurotic melodrama". Lee Pfeiffer from Cinema Retro, in a review of the Criterion Collection's blu-ray release of the film, compares it with Daves's seminal 3:10 to Yuma, saying "there is much in Jubal that rivals that classic". 
On Rotten Tomatoes the film holds 100% approval rating based on 10 reviews.

Home media 
Jubal was released by the Criterion Collection in Blu-Ray and DVD.

See also

 List of American films of 1956
 3:10 to Yuma, the 1957 film also starring Glenn Ford and directed by Delmer Daves
 Paul Wellman, author of Jubal which was loosely based on Othello

References

External links
 
 
 
 
 Jubal: Awakened to Goodness an essay by Kent Jones at the Criterion Collection

1956 Western (genre) films
1956 films
CinemaScope films
Columbia Pictures films
1950s English-language films
Films based on American novels
Films based on Othello
Films based on adaptations
Films directed by Delmer Daves
Films scored by David Raksin
Revisionist Western (genre) films
American Western (genre) films
1950s American films